HemoSpat is bloodstain pattern analysis software created by FORident Software in 2006.  Using photos from a bloodshed incident at a crime scene, a bloodstain pattern analyst can use HemoSpat to calculate the area-of-origin of impact patterns.  This information may be useful for determining position and posture of suspects and victims, sequencing of events, corroborating or refuting testimony, and for crime scene reconstruction.

The results of the analyses may be viewed in 2D within the software as top-down, side, and front views, or exported to several 3D formats for integration with point cloud or modelling software.  The formats which HemoSpat exports  include:
 AUTOCAD DXF
 COLLADA
 PLY
 VRML
 Wavefront OBJ

HemoSpat is capable of calculating impact pattern origins with only part of the pattern available, as well as impacts on non-orthogonal surfaces.
HemoSpat has also been used in research into what kind of information may be captured from cast-off patterns, methods of scene documentation, and in improving area-of-origin calculations.

References

External links 

 – official site

Blood
Forensic software
Software that uses Qt